What Remains is a 2022 American independent drama film starring Cress Williams, Kellan Lutz, and Anne Heche. The film revolves around a small-town murder connected to a local pastor and an ex-con.

What Remains is one of the final feature films for Heche, who wrapped her scenes in late October 2021 before her death in August 2022.

Synopsis
A small-town pastor is forced to reckon with an act of forgiveness when the convict he forgave for murdering his wife returns to town five years later, while the town sheriff investigates another murder that may be related.

Cast
 Cress Williams as Marshall Shepard
 Kellan Lutz as Troy Parker Jr.
 Anne Heche as Maureen Silverton
 Marcus Gladney Jr. as Samuel Shepard
 Stelio Savante as Scott
 Juliana Destefano as Kaitlyn
 Maria Gajdosik as Dylan
 Korey Scott Pollard as Willis
 Lindsay Walker as Elizabeth

Production
Filming took place in Amarillo, Texas, over five weeks. A total of 21 students from John Paul the Great Catholic University served in various roles on set, representing over a quarter of the film’s crew.

Release
The film premiered at the 2022 Austin Film Festival, alongside notable films like Darren Aronofsky’s The Whale (2022 film) and Sam and Kate.  The film had a simultaneous VOD release and limited theatrical run. The film was released on December 2nd, 2022.

Reception

Rod Machen, a film critic for the Austin Chronicle, wrote: "What Remains is an example of what can happen when filmmakers tackle tough issues head on. Using non-linear storytelling, What Remains eschews the easy answers of simple movies and takes the audience on a painful ride with a man who tries to do the right thing but can never be sure that he’s pulling it off. Real life is always more complicated than we wish it was.”

References

External links
 

2022 independent films
2022 drama films
2020s thriller drama films